Mount Majestic, also known as Majestic Mountain, is a  elevation Navajo Sandstone double-summit mountain located in Zion National Park, in Washington County of southwest Utah, United States.

Description
Majestic is the parent to Cathedral Mountain, with only 0.24 mile of separation between them. Other neighbors include The Great White Throne, Observation Point, Red Arch Mountain, Lady Mountain, Castle Dome, Cable Mountain, and Angels Landing. This feature's name was officially adopted in 1934 by the U.S. Board on Geographic Names.

Climate
Spring and fall are the most favorable seasons to visit Mount Majestic. According to the Köppen climate classification system, it is located in a Cold semi-arid climate zone, which is defined by the coldest month having an average mean temperature below , and at least 50% of the total annual precipitation being received during the spring and summer.

Gallery

See also

 List of mountains in Utah
 Geology of the Zion and Kolob canyons area
 Colorado Plateau

References

External links

 Zion National Park National Park Service
 Weather forecast: Mount Majestic

Majestic
Majestic
Majestic
Majestic
Majestic
Majestic